ΑΙ-Hasan ibn Ali ibn Ahmad al-Katib (d. 11th century) more commonly known as al-Hasan al-Katib was a Fatimid municipal secretary, philosopher of music and Sufi saint of Egypt. He learned the knowledge of Sufism from Rudbari. He is widely known for his book Kamal Adab al-Ghina.

References 

Egyptian Sufi saints
11th-century people from the Fatimid Caliphate
11th-century Arabic writers
11th-century Arabs